The third and final season of Tangle, an Australian drama television series, premiered on Showcase on 25 March 2012. It consists of 6 episodes and concluded on 29 April 2012. 

It was confirmed in December 2010, with production beginning in June 2011 and ended in August. It is written by Fiona Seres and Tony McNamara, and directed by Emma Freeman and Michael James Rowland.

Cast

Regular
 Justine Clarke as Ally Kovac
 Kat Stewart as Nat Manning
 Catherine McClements as Christine Williams
 Joel Tobeck as Tim Williams
 Matt Day as Gabriel Lucas
Blake Davis as Max Williams
 Lincoln Younes as Romeo Kovac
 Eva Lazzaro as Gigi Kovac
 Kick Gurry as Joe Kovac

Recurring
 Jane Allsop as Tanya
Lucia Emmerichs as Ophelia
 Georgia Flood as Charlotte Barker
 Dan Wyllie as Michael Chubievsky
Michael Clarke-Tokely as Luke Wintle
Maude Davey as Agatha
Tony Rickards as Billy Hall

Episodes

Awards and nominations

Wins
 AACTA Award for Most Outstanding Drama – Tangle
 ASTRA Award for Most Outstanding Performance By An Actor: Male – Lincoln Younes
 ASTRA Award for Most Outstanding Performance By An Actor: Female – Catherine McClements

Nominations
 ASTRA Award for Best Television Drama Series – Tangle
 ASTRA Award for Most Outstanding Performance By An Actor: Male – Dan Wyllie
 ASTRA Award for Most Outstanding Performance By An Actor: Female – Justine Clarke
 ASTRA Award for Most Outstanding Performance By An Actor: Female – Eva Lazzaro
 Logie Award for Most Outstanding Drama Series – Tangle
 Logie Award for Most Outstanding Actress – Catherine McClements

DVD release

References

2012 Australian television seasons